The Busitema University Faculty of Health Sciences (BUFHS), also known as the Busitema University Medical School (BUMS) and the Busitema University School of Medicine (BUSM), is the school of medicine of Busitema University, one of Uganda's public universities. The medical school is one of the newer medical schools in the country, having been part of university since 2013. The school provides medical education at undergraduate and postgraduate levels.

Location
The school's campus is on the premises of the Mbale Regional Referral Hospital on Pallisa Road in the central business district of the city of Mbale, in Uganda's Eastern Region. The coordinates of the school are 1°04'55.0"N, 34°10'35.0"E (Latitude:1.081944; Longitude:34.176389).

Overview
The school constitutes the Faculty of Health Sciences at Busitema University. The faculty is headed by Dean Professor Julius Wandabwa, who is deputized by Dr. Joseph Mpagi Luwaga. The teaching disciplines of the medical school are integrated with the regional referral hospital. The hospital's consultants, registrars, and interns collaborate in teaching the university's medical and nursing students.

Undergraduate Programmes 
The following undergraduate programmes are offered:

 
 1. Bachelor of Medicine and Bachelor of Surgery (MBChB) 
The degree is awarded after three years of pre-clinical instruction and examination in anatomy, physiology, biochemistry, microbiology, pathology, and pharmacology, followed by two years of clinical instruction and examination in general surgery, internal medicine, pediatrics, obstetrics & gynecology, psychiatry, otolaryngology, neurosurgery, orthopedics, anesthesiology, urology, and public health.

 2. Bachelor of Science in Nursing (BNS)
The degree is awarded after four years of instruction and examination.
 3. Bachelor of Science in Anaesthesia 
The degree is awarded after four years of instruction and examination.

Postgraduate Programmes 
The following postgraduate programmes are offered:

 
 1. Master of Medicine in Internal Medicine (MMed in Medicine)
 2. Master of Public Health (MPH)
 3. Master of Medicine in Pediatrics and Child Health  (MMed in Pediatrics)

Planned programmes
, the following academic programmes were being planned.

 1. Bachelor of Clinical Medicine & Community Health
 2. Bachelor of Pharmacy
 3. Master of Medicine in Surgery
 4. Master of Medicine in Obstetrics and Gynecology.

See also
 Education in Uganda
 List of medical schools in Uganda
 List of hospitals in Uganda

References

External links
 Busitema University Faculty of Health and Science Homepage
 Busitema University Homepage

Medical schools in Uganda
Educational institutions established in 2013
2013 establishments in Uganda